Raimal Singh Sisodia, also known as Rana Raimal, (r. 1473–1509) was a Hindu Rajput ruler of Mewar. Maharana Raimal was the son of Rana Kumbha. He came to power by defeating his patricide predecessor, Udai Singh I in battles at Jawar, Darimpur and Pangarh. Early in Raimal's reign, Ghiyas Shah of Malwa attacked Chittor unsuccessfully. Soon after, Ghiyas Shah's general, Zafar Khan attacked Mewar and was defeated at Mandalgarh and Khairabad. By marrying Sringardevi (daughter of Rao Jodha), Raimal ended the conflict with the Rathores. During Raimal's reign, Godwar, Toda and Ajmer were captured by his son Prithviraj. Raimal also strengthened the state of Mewar and repaired the temple of Eklingji in Chittor.

Ascent to the throne 
Raimal was not the heir-apparent, he was younger to Udai Singh I. But as fate would have it, Udai Singh I killed his father, the legendary Rana Kumbha, while he was praying to Lord Eklingji (Shiva) and ruled for five years. Under his reign Mewar took back Abu and Ajmer, both states were recaptured by the great ruler of Mewar.

Raimal fights the sultan and his nephews 
Sultan of Delhi, Sikander Lodi fought against Rana Raimal of Mewar, allying with Surajmal and Sahasmal in which Sultan was defeated.  Surajmal survived and was pardoned by Rana Raimal. He was a conspirator and ensured that sons of Raimal fought with each other in order to make his way clear to the throne. He was a brave fighter and possessed all the great qualities of his clan.

Fight at Sadri 
Surajmal and Raimal's armies met at Sadri, a town that Surajmal had captured. Raimal's son Prithviraj joined his father at a crucial time in the war and directly attacked Surajmal. Many such skirmishes occurred till Surajmal finally left Mewar and settled at Pratapgarh where his descendants still flourish and keep up the name of Sisodia clan.

Last years 
The last years of Raimal's rule were marked by conflict between his sons, with Prince Sanga (later Rana Sanga) having to flee Mewar. Raimal's elder sons, Prithviraj and Jaimal were both killed. At this difficult juncture, the Rana was informed that Sanga was still alive. Raimal summoned Sanga back to Chittor and died soon afterwards.

References

Bibliography 

 

Mewar dynasty
1473 births
1509 deaths
Rajput rulers